Stepan Grigorievich Kucherov ( – 30 March 1973) was a Soviet naval officer.

Biography 
Kucherov was born in Olshanka in what is now the Arkadaksky District of Saratov Oblast. After joining the Soviet Navy in 1922, he advanced through the ranks and held various commands, including Chief of Staff of the Northern Fleet (August 1940), Commander of the White Sea Flotilla (February 1943), and Deputy Chief of Staff of the Soviet Navy (1944–45). In this capacity he participated in the conferences at Yalta and Potsdam. After the war he commanded the Caspian Flotilla and from 1950 took up a series of teaching and administrative positions at the Military Academy. He retired in 1967. Kucherov received several decorations, including two of the highest honors in the Soviet Navy: the Order of Nakhimov and the Order of Ushakov First Class.

Legacy 
An Udaloy II class destroyer named Admiral Kucherov was laid down in 1991 but scrapped in 1993.

References

External links 
 Photo of Rear Admiral Kucherov while Chief of Staff of the Northern Fleet

1902 births
1973 deaths
People from Saratov Oblast
Communist Party of the Soviet Union members
Soviet admirals
Soviet military personnel of World War II
Recipients of the Order of Lenin
Recipients of the Order of the Red Banner
Recipients of the Order of Nakhimov
Recipients of the Order of Ushakov, 1st class
Burials at Novodevichy Cemetery
Recipients of the Navy Cross (United States)